Yo Soy is the fifth (5th) studio album by Puerto Rican singer Yolandita Monge. Monge returned from México to record this album in Puerto Rico under the label AudioVox Records.  With this release the singer started exploring adult themed songs. It was released in 1973 and contains the radio hits Amor Mío and Estoy Celosa.

The album was first re-issued in 1987 and then in 90’s by the label Disco Hit in cassette format.  It is currently out of print in all media layouts.

Track listing

Credits and personnel
Vocals: Yolandita Monge
Producer: Enrique Méndez
Musical Direction and Arrangements: Héctor Garrido

Notes
Track listing and credits from album cover.
Re-released in Cassette Format by Disco Hit Productions/Aponte Latin Music Distribution (DHC-1644)

References

Yolandita Monge albums
1973 albums